Vibha Bhatnagar is a London-based entrepreneur. Born in India on 11 September, she has been a part of the film industry for over two decades.

Career 
Bhatnagar is a financial consultant, serial entrepreneur and a film maker. She has been involved in businesses in the UK, UAE, India, USA, Mauritius and Indonesia. She has produced several Bollywood and British feature films.

In addition to her involvement in the film industry, Bhatnagar is the managing partner of Alpha Investment Capital. She has also developed and is the co-founder of the lifestyle brand "The PoEM". She has co-founded the PoEM Foundation  which was created as a global platform. It is a movement to provide a unique set of solutions which enable people around the world to enjoy fulfilling lives of sustainable wellbeing and vitality. These initiatives form the key components to restoring Dignity and enriching lives globally. The very first World Dignity Forum  is being launched in India. This launch coincides with and amplifies a new era of kindness, respect and dignity on Earth. Vibha is also been the founder/promoters of a robotic fully automated car parking technology called NGP Parking Solutions. NGP offers parking solutions globally and is executing several projects under Public-Private Partnerships in UAE.

Filmography 
Vibha, as part of her production houses, has produced  Hindi, Tamil and English language films:

Hindi 
 Chocolate: Deep Dark Secrets (2005)
 Kaun Hai Jo Sapno Mein Aaya (2004)
 Shukriya: Till Death Do Us Apart (2004)
 Amar Joshi Shaheed Ho Gaya Tamil 
 London (2005)

 English 
 Red Mercury (2005)
 Take 3 Girls (2006)
 Natasha (2006)
 Exitz'' (2007)

References

External links 
 

Living people
British film producers
Year of birth missing (living people)